Rajgarh is a village in Sangod in Kota district in the Indian state of Rajasthan.

Government 
The village is represented by an elected sarpanch (head of village).

Geography 
Rajgarh is located on the Paravan riverside. It was a historical village known as Tikana Rajgarh of Kota Reyasat.

Demographics 
The village population is 1781 in 344 households, of which 927 are males while 854 are females as per the 2011 census.

Children age 0-6 number 256 or 14.37%. The average sex ratio is 921, lower than the state average of 928. The child sex ratio is 1098, higher than Rajasthan average of 888.
    
The village has a literacy rate of 72% compared to 66% average in Rajasthan. The male literacy stands at 85%, while female literacy rate was 58%.

Religious sites

Kulama Balaji 
Kulama Balaji is the ancient temple of lord Hanuman. It is a main religious center for Hindus from Kota, Bundi, Baran and Jhalawad.

8-Pillared Cenotaph 
The 8 Pillared Cenotaph is a chhatri that is located on the Paravan riverside.

Rata Devi 
Rata Devi is an ancient Hindu temple that is situated in Sorsan Grasslands near Rajgarh village.

This temple is in the runnel side of a rivulet known as “Rata Daha” in Arean (local) language, that flows towards Paravan River at a distance of 500 meters from Rata Devi temple.

he Paravan River and Rata Daha (rivulet) meeting place attract birds and other animals to drink, mostly deer of Sorsan Wildlife Sanctuary.

References 

Villages in Kota district